Wallisdown and Winton West is a ward in Bournemouth, Dorset. Since 2019, the ward has elected 2 councillors to Bournemouth, Christchurch and Poole Council.

History 
The ward formerly elected councillors to Bournemouth Borough Council before it was abolished in 2019.

Geography 
The Wallisdown and Winton West ward is in Bournemouth, covering the suburbs of Wallisdown, Talbot Village, Slades Farm, Victoria Park, the southern areas of Ensbury Park and Redhill and the western areas of Winton.

Elections

2019 Bournemouth, Christchurch and Poole Council election

References 

Wards of Bournemouth, Christchurch and Poole